Hocus Pocus is a 1993 American fantasy comedy film that follows a villainous comedic trio of witches (Bette Midler, Sarah Jessica Parker, and Kathy Najimy) who are inadvertently resurrected by a  teenage boy (Omri Katz) in Salem, Massachusetts, on Halloween night. The film is directed by Kenny Ortega from a screenplay by Mick Garris and Neil Cuthbert, and a story by David Kirschner and Garris.

The film was released in North America on July 16, 1993, by Walt Disney Pictures. Upon its release, it received mixed reviews from film critics and was not a box office success, possibly losing Disney around $16.5 million during its theatrical run. However, largely through many annual airings on Disney Channel and Freeform (formerly ABC Family, Fox Family and The Family Channel) all throughout the month of October, Hocus Pocus has been rediscovered by audiences, resulting in a yearly spike in home media sales of the film every Halloween season. The annual celebration of Halloween has helped make the film a cult classic.

A sequel, Hocus Pocus 2, written by Jen D'Angelo and directed by Anne Fletcher, was released on September 30, 2022, on Disney+.

Plot 
On October 31, 1693, in Salem, Massachusetts, Thackery Binx witnesses his little sister Emily being whisked away to the woods by the Sanderson sisters, three witches who are named Winifred, Sarah, and Mary. Binx confronts the witches, but he fails to save Emily and her life force is drained, making the witches young again. After that, Binx is transformed into a black cat by the witches, cursed to live forever with his guilt for not saving Emily. 

Having been alerted by Binx's friend Elijah, the townsfolk arrest the sisters for the murder of Emily. Before the Sanderson sisters are hanged in the town square while they are denying any knowledge of what happened to Thackery, Winifred casts a curse that will resurrect the sisters during a full moon on All Hallows' Eve if a virgin lights the Black Flame Candle in their cottage. Binx decides to guard the cottage so no one can bring the witches back to life.

Three centuries later, on October 31, 1993, Max Dennison reluctantly takes his younger sister Dani out trick-or-treating where they meet Max's new classmate Allison Watts whom he is attracted to. The three visit the former Sanderson cottage, now an abandoned museum, where Max inadvertently resurrects the witches. The witches attempt to suck the soul of Dani, but Max comes to her rescue. 

Escaping, Max steals Winifred's spellbook on advice from the immortal cat Binx. He takes the group to an old cemetery where they are protected from the witches since it is hallowed ground. The witches eventually catch up to them at the cemetery where Winifred raises her former love interest Billy Butcherson from the grave and sends him after the children.

The witches pursue the children across town using Mary's enhanced sense of smell. Winifred reveals that the spell that brought them back only works on Halloween and unless they can suck the life out of at least one child, they will turn to dust when the sun rises. After luring them to the high school, the children trap the witches in a pottery kiln and burn them alive. However, whilst the children are celebrating, the witches' curse revives them again.

Not realizing the witches have survived, Max and Allison open the spellbook, hoping to reverse the spell on Binx. The open spell book reveals the location of the group, and the witches track them down, kidnap Dani and Binx, and recover the spellbook. Sarah uses her singing to lure Salem's children to the Sanderson cottage. Max and Allison free Dani and Binx by tricking the witches into believing that sunrise was an hour early. Thinking that they are done for, the witches panic and pass out, allowing Max, Dani, Allison, and Binx to escape.

Back at the cemetery, Billy catches up to the children, takes Max's knife, cuts his stitched mouth open, and insults Winifred before joining the children against the witches. The witches attack from the air and snatch Dani. Winifred attempts to use the last vial of potion to suck the soul of Dani, but Binx knocks the potion out of her hand which Max catches and promptly drinks, forcing the witches to take him instead of Dani. 

The sun starts to rise just as Winifred is about to finish draining Max's life force. In the ensuing struggle, Allison, Dani, and Billy fend off Mary and Sarah. Max and Winifred, struggling in the air, fall onto the hallowed ground in the cemetery, causing Winifred to turn into stone. As the sun finishes rising above the horizon, Mary and Sarah are disintegrated into dust along with Winifred's stone body. 

The witches' deaths break Binx's curse, allowing him to finally die and freeing his soul, reuniting him with Emily as they both head off into the afterlife while Billy returns to his grave to sleep. Winifred's spellbook opens its eye once more, revealing that it is still alive, indicating that the witches could possibly return again someday.

Cast 
Source:

Production

Development 
In the 1994 TV documentary Hocus Pocus: Begin the Magic, and on the film's Blu-ray release, producer David Kirschner explains how he came up with the idea for the film one night. He and his young daughter were sitting outside and his neighbor's black cat strayed by. Kirschner invented a tale of how the cat was once a boy who was changed into a feline three hundred years ago by three witches.

Hocus Pocus started life as a script by Mick Garris, that was bought by Walt Disney Pictures in 1984. The film's working title was Disney's Halloween House, it was much darker and scarier, and its protagonists were all 12-year-olds. Garris and Kirschner pitched it to Steven Spielberg's Amblin Entertainment; Spielberg saw Disney as a competitor to Amblin in the family film market at the time and refused to co-produce a film with his "rival."

Writing 
Various rewrites were made to the script to make the film more comedic and made two of its young protagonists into teenagers; however, production was stalled several times until 1992, when Bette Midler expressed interest in the script and the project immediately went forward. Midler, who plays the central antagonist of the film (originally written for Cloris Leachman), is quoted as saying that Hocus Pocus "was the most fun I'd had in my career up to that point".

Casting 
Leonardo DiCaprio was originally offered the lead role of Max but he declined it in order to pursue What's Eating Gilbert Grape.

Filming 
Principal photography began on October 12, 1992. The film is set in Salem, Massachusetts, but most of it was shot on sound stages in Burbank, California. However, its daytime scenes were filmed in Salem and Marblehead, Massachusetts during two weeks of filming with principal cast. Production was completed on February 10, 1993.

Pioneer Village, a recreation of early-colonial Salem, was used for the opening scenes set in 1693. Other locations included Old Burial Hill in Marblehead, where Max is accosted by Ice and Jay, the Old Town Hall in Salem, where the town Halloween party takes place, and Phillips Elementary School, where the witches are trapped in a kiln. The exterior for Max and Dani's house is a private residence on Ocean Avenue in Salem.

Release 
The film was theatrically released by Walt Disney Pictures in the United States and Canada on July 16, 1993. The film received mixed reviews from film critics at the time of its release.  It was not a critical or commercial success upon its release, possibly losing Disney around $16.5 million during its theatrical run. However, largely through many annual airings on Disney Channel and Freeform (formerly ABC Family) all throughout the month of October, Hocus Pocus has been rediscovered by audiences, resulting in a yearly spike in home video sales of the film every Halloween season. The annual celebration of Halloween has helped make this film a cult classic.

Home media 
Walt Disney Home Video released the film on VHS and LaserDisc in the United States and Canada on January 5, 1994. and later to DVD on June 4, 2002. Following the film's release on DVD, it has continued to show strong annual sales, raking in more than $1 million in DVD sales each October. In the mid-to-late 1990s, the film was rebroadcast annually on ABC and Disney Channel before switching over to ABC Family's 13 Nights of Halloween lineup in the early 2000s. The film has continuously brought record viewing numbers to the lineup, including a 2009 broadcast watched by 2.5 million viewers. In 2011, an October 29 airing became the lineup's most watched program, with 2.8 million viewers. On September 4, 2012, the film was released on Blu-ray. Disney re-released the film on Blu-ray and Digital HD on September 2, 2018, as part of the film's 25th anniversary. The new release contains special features, including deleted scenes and a behind-the-scenes retrospective. On 15 September 2020, the film was released on Ultra HD Blu-ray in 4K resolution with HDR.

Music 

The musical score for Hocus Pocus was composed and conducted by John Debney. James Horner was originally slated to score the film, but became unavailable at the last minute, so Debney had to score the entire film in two weeks. Even though he didn't score the film, Horner came back to write the theme for Sarah (sung by Sarah Jessica Parker, more commonly known as "Come Little Children") which is featured in Intrada's Complete Edition of the score.

Debney released a promotional score through the internet containing 19 tracks from the film. Bootlegs were subsequently released across the internet, primarily because the promotional release missed the entire opening sequence music.

 Songs
 "Sarah's Theme" – music by James Horner; lyrics by Brock Walsh; performed by Sarah Jessica Parker
 "I Put a Spell on You" – written by Jay Hawkins and produced and arranged by Marc Shaiman; performed by Bette Midler
 "Witchcraft" – written by Cy Coleman, Carolyn Leigh; performed by Joe Malone
 "I Put a Spell on You" – written by Jay Hawkins; performed by Joe Malone
 "Sabre Dance" – written by Aram Khachaturian, arranged by George Wilson
 Chants and Incantations – conceived and written by Brock Walsh

Reception

SVOD viewership 
According to Whip Media, Hocus Pocus was the 7th most watched movie across all platforms in the United States, during the week of October 31, 2021. According to Whip Media, Hocus Pocus was the 2nd most watched movie across all platforms in the United States, during the week of September 30, 2022 to October 2, 2022, the 7th during the week of October 9, 2022, and the 9th during the week of October 23, 2022.

Box office 
Hocus Pocus was released July 16, 1993, and came in fourth place on its opening weekend, grossing $8.1 million. It dropped from the top ten ranking after two weeks of release. The film was released the same day as Free Willy. According to Kirschner, Disney chose to release Hocus Pocus in July to take advantage of children being off school for the summer.

In October 2020, amid the COVID-19 pandemic, Hocus Pocus was re-released in 2,570 theaters. It made $1.9 million over the weekend, finishing second behind Tenet. The following two weekends it made $1.2 million and $756,000, respectively.

Critical response 
On review aggregator Rotten Tomatoes, the film has an approval rating of 38% based on 60 reviews, with an average rating of 4.9/10. The website's critical consensus reads, "Harmlessly hokey yet never much more than mediocre, Hocus Pocus is a muddled family-friendly effort that fails to live up to the talents of its impressive cast." Metacritic assigned the film a weighted average score of 43 out of 100, based on 27 critics, indicating "mixed or average reviews". Audiences polled by CinemaScore gave the film an average grade of "B+" on an A+ to F scale.

Gene Siskel, reviewing for The Chicago Tribune, remarked that the film was a "dreadful witches' comedy with the only tolerable moment coming when Bette Midler presents a single song." Roger Ebert in The Chicago Sun-Times gave the film one star out of a possible four, writing that it was "a confusing cauldron in which there is great activity but little progress, and a lot of hysterical shrieking". The Miami Herald called it "a pretty lackluster affair", adding this comment: "Despite the triple-threat actress combo, Hocus Pocus won't be the Sister Act of 1993. There are a lot of gotta-sees this summer, and this isn't one of them."

Janet Maslin of The New York Times wrote that the film "has flashes of visual stylishness but virtually no grip on its story". Ty Burr of Entertainment Weekly gave the film a C−, calling it "acceptable scary-silly kid fodder that adults will find only mildly insulting. Unless they're Bette Midler fans. In which case it's depressing as hell"; and stating that while Najimy and Parker "have their moments of ramshackle comic inspiration, and the passable special effects should keep younger campers transfixed [...] [T]he sight of the Divine Miss M. mugging her way through a cheesy supernatural kiddie comedy is, to say the least, dispiriting." Kim Newman of Empire Magazine gave the film two stars out of five, writing, "Trying to break expectations isn't always a wise idea and here Disney show how not to do it. With this supposed-family movie, they disappoint on nearly every level. The plot is weak, the action poor and it's got Bette Midler, simply dreadful."

Accolades

Legacy 

Over the years, the film has achieved cult status. In its 25th anniversary year in 2018, the first week of Hocus Pocus viewings on Freeform averaged 8.2 million viewers. A special called the "Hocus Pocus 25th Anniversary Halloween Bash" was filmed at the Hollywood Forever Cemetery and features interviews with members of the cast, including Bette Midler, Sarah Jessica Parker, and Kathy Najimy, as well as a costume contest hosted by Sharon and Kelly Osbourne. It aired on Freeform October 20, 2018.

In October 2011, the Houston Symphony celebrated various horror and Halloween classics, including Hocus Pocus, with "The Hocus Pocus Pops". On October 19, 2013, D23 held a special screening of Hocus Pocus at the Walt Disney Studios in Burbank, California, to honor the 20th anniversary of the film. Nine of the cast and crew gathered for the screening, and hundreds of D23 members attended. Returning members included Kathy Najimy, David Kirschner, Thora Birch, Doug Jones, Vinessa Shaw, and Omri Katz.

During her Divine Intervention Tour in 2015, Bette Midler appeared on stage dressed as Winifred Sanderson. Her Harlettes appeared with her dressed as Mary and Sarah, and the three of them performed the film's version of "I Put a Spell on You."

On September 15, 2015, the Hocus Pocus Villain Spelltacular was introduced at the Magic Kingdom as a part of Mickey's Not-So-Scary Halloween Party. The show introduces new actresses as the Sanderson Sisters who try to make a villain party and summon or attract various Disney villains in the process. In September 2016, entertainment critic Aaron Wallace published Hocus Pocus in Focus: The Thinking Fan's Guide to Disney's Halloween Classic, the first full-length book written about the film. The book includes a foreword by Thora Birch and afterword by Mick Garris. Billed as a "lighthearted but scholarly look at the film", the book analyzes the film's major themes, which it identifies as festivity, nostalgia, home, horror, virginity, feminism, Broadway-style musical moments, sibling rivalry, "Spielbergian" filmmaking style, Disney villain traditions, and more. Wallace also analyzes Walt Disney World's Hocus Pocus Villain Spelltacular as part of the film's legacy and includes "the largest collection of Hocus Pocus fun facts and trivia ever assembled", complete with extensive endnote citations.

The City of Salem has celebrated its connection to Hocus Pocus, while local filming sites have become an attraction for fans as the film's legacy has grown over the years. In 2018, the Haunted Happenings Grand Parade, an annual Salem festival held every October, was Hocus Pocus-themed in honor of the film's 25th anniversary. A representative for Destination Salem also reported a huge uptick in tourism for the 25th anniversary year, stating: "There's always been a ‘Hocus Pocus’ component to the visitors to Salem, especially in October. But it's like the film's following grows every year.”

The cast reunited for "In Search of the Sanderson Sisters: A Hocus Pocus Hulaween Takeover" which aired on October 30, 2020. The one-hour broadcast was virtual due to the COVID-19 pandemic, and the proceeds will go to the New York Restoration Project. Members of the cast who participated were Bette Midler, Sarah Jessica Parker, Kathy Najimy, Thora Birch, Omri Katz, Vinessa Shaw, and Doug Jones. Other notable participants of the benefit included Meryl Streep, Mariah Carey, Cassandra Peterson, Glenn Close, Billy Crystal, Jamie Lee Curtis, Todrick Hall, Jennifer Hudson, Anjelah Johnson-Reyes, Michael Kors, Adam Lambert, George Lopez, Alex Moffat, Martin Short, Sarah Silverman, John Stamos, Kenan Thompson, Sophie von Haselberg, and Bella Hadid.

The Sanderson Sisters appear as playable characters in Disney video games such as Disney Heroes: Battle Mode and Disney Magic Kingdoms.

Sequel 

In a November 2014 interview, Bette Midler said that she was ready and willing to return for a sequel, and she also said that her co-stars Sarah Jessica Parker and Kathy Najimy were also interested in returning for a sequel. Midler stressed the fact that Disney had yet to greenlight any sequel. In October 2016, Sarah Jessica was asked the prospects of a sequel and said "I would love that. I think we've been very vocal that we're very keen." 
        
In October 2019, a sequel which was going to be developed as a Disney+ exclusive film was announced, with a screenplay which was written by Jen D'Angelo. Midler, Parker, and Najimy all confirmed their interest in reprising their roles. In March 2020, Adam Shankman signed on to direct. In May 2021, it was confirmed that Midler, Parker, and Najimy would reprise their roles as the Sanderson Sisters and it was announced that the film would be released in 2022. The film was released on September 30, 2022.

Musical adaptation 
During an interview leading up to the release of Hocus Pocus 2, David Kirschner revealed that a Broadway musical adaptation of the original film is in development. He also stated that "I just want to pinch myself, and I’m just afraid that I’m going to be 9 years old and on a Little League field again. But it’s just so wonderful just to stand back and watch all of this ... I think you’re going to be very pleased." Kenny Ortega revealed to Forbes in 2020 of his interest in possibly returning to direct the production, saying "I think a Hocus Pocus musical would be great fun, really great fun."

See also 
 List of American films of 1993

References

External links 

 
 
 
 

1993 films
1993 comedy films
1990s American films
1990s children's comedy films
1990s children's fantasy films
1990s English-language films
1990s fantasy comedy films
American children's comedy films
American children's fantasy films
American fantasy comedy films
American films about Halloween
American supernatural comedy films
American zombie comedy films
Films about cats
Films about curses
Films about hypnosis
Films about immortality
Films about potions
Films about Satanism
Films about sisters
Films about virginity
Films about witchcraft
Films directed by Kenny Ortega
Films produced by David Kirschner
Films produced by Steven Haft
Films scored by James Horner
Films scored by John Debney
Films set in the 1690s
Films set in 1993
Films set in Massachusetts
Films set in the Thirteen Colonies
Films shot in California
Films shot in Los Angeles
Films shot in Massachusetts
Films with screenplays by David Kirschner
Films with screenplays by Mick Garris
Hocus Pocus
Resurrection in film
Salem witch trials in fiction
Walt Disney Pictures films